Trebež  may refer to:

 Trebež near Barajevo, an industrial zone near Belgrade, Serbia
 Trebež, Brežice, a village in Slovenia
 Trebež, Ivančna Gorica, a village in Slovenia
 Trebež, a village near Jasenovac, Sisak-Moslavina County, Croatia
 Trebež, one of the parts of the Lonja river in Croatia